Kuhn & Komor, also known colloquially as K&K, was a Hungarian multinational luxury jeweler and specialty retailer headquartered in Shanghai, China. K&K produced jewelry, sterling silver, china, crystal, stationery, and personal accessories. K&K was renowned in East Asia for its luxury goods, also being called the "Asprey of Asia."

History 
The Komor family was Jewish and originally came from Hungary.

Moritz Montague Kuhn founded Kuhn & Co in Yokohama in 1869, a shop filled with Curios, curiosities from the Far East (or souvenir shop). Siegfried Komo, the nephew of Kuhn, came to Japan in 1887 to work for his uncle, followed by the son ok Kuhn, Arthur, who arrived in Japan in 1890. In 1894, Siegfried Komo and Arthur Kuhn founded Kuhn & Komor in Yokohama.

The company opened a shop in the Shanghai Palace Hotel in Shanghai. They later opened a shop on No. 37 Water Street (水町通り) in Yokohama. The company existed roughly until the 1930s, when the outbreak of World War II brought it to an end.

Items by Kuhn & Komor receive high prices on auctions.

References

External links 

Jewellery companies of China
Jewellery companies of Japan
Hungarian silversmiths
Luxury brands
Defunct retail companies of China
Companies based in Shanghai
Design companies established in 1869
Retail companies established in 1869
Companies disestablished in the 1930s
1897 establishments in Hong Kong
1930s disestablishments in China
Shops in Shanghai
Shops in Yokohama